Cerithideopsis montagnei is a species of sea snail, a marine gastropod mollusk in the family Potamididae.

Description

Distribution
This marine species occurs in the Caribbean Sea off Panama.

References

 Reid D.G. & Claremont M. (2014) The genus Cerithideopsis Thiele, 1929 (Gastropoda: Potamididae) in the Indo-West Pacific region. Zootaxa 3779(1): 61–80

Potamididae
Gastropods described in 1839